Luca Meregalli (born 14 July 1991) is an Italian professional footballer who plays as a centre-back for Eccellenza club Cisanese.

Club career

Early career 
Meregalli joined Milan as a youngster. Throughout his time in the club's youth system, he has been a member of the under-20 side who won the Coppa Italia Primavera in 2010, 25 years after their last success — though he missed both legs of the final due to injury.

Pro Vercelli 
For the 2010–11 season, Meregalli was loaned out to Seconda Divisione club Pro Belvedere. Soon later, the club merged with bankruptcy-threatened crosstown rivals U.S. Pro Vercelli to form F.C. Pro Vercelli 1892.

Meregalli made his official debut for the club in the first game of the Coppa Italia Lega Pro group stage against Valenzana, on 15 August 2010. He came off the bench during the second half, as Pro Vercelli won the match 2–0.

Pavia 
On 31 January 2011, Meregalli was sent on another loan deal to Prima Divisione side Pavia for the remainder of the season.

References

External links
Luca Meregalli at TuttoCampo

Living people
1991 births
Italian footballers
Sportspeople from Monza
Association football defenders
Footballers from Lombardy
Serie C players
Serie D players
A.C. Monza players
A.C. Milan players
F.C. Pro Vercelli 1892 players
F.C. Pavia players
Piacenza Calcio 1919 players
A.C. Ponte San Pietro Isola S.S.D. players
Virtus Bergamo Alzano Seriate 1909 players
Tritium Calcio 1908 players